Bergmo Church was a parish church of the Church of Norway in Molde Municipality in Møre og Romsdal county, Norway. It was an annex church for the Bolsøy parish which is part of the Molde domprosti (arch-deanery) in the Diocese of Møre. The red, wooden building was bought by the parish and converted into a church in 1982. The building was designed by the architect Trond Lage Edvardsen. The church seated about 300 people. The church was closed and sold in the summer of 2017. The people of the Bergmo church have attended Nordbyen Church since that time.

See also
List of churches in Møre

References

Buildings and structures in Molde
Churches in Møre og Romsdal
Wooden churches in Norway
20th-century Church of Norway church buildings
Churches completed in 1982
1982 establishments in Norway
2017 disestablishments in Norway